The United States District Court for the Southern District of Georgia (in case citations, S.D. Ga.) is a federal court in the Eleventh Circuit (except for patent claims and claims against the U.S. government under the Tucker Act, which are appealed to the Federal Circuit).

 the United States Attorney for the District is Jill E. Steinberg.

History 
The United States District Court for the District of Georgia was one of the original thirteen courts established by the Judiciary Act of 1789, on September 24, 1789. The District was further subdivided into Northern and Southern Districts on August 11, 1848, by {.

Jurisdiction 
The Augusta Division comprises the following counties: Burke, Columbia, Glascock, Jefferson, Lincoln, McDuffie, Richmond, Taliaferro, Warren and Wilkes.

The Brunswick Division comprises the following counties: Appling, Camden, Glynn, Long, McIntosh, Jeff Davis, and Wayne.

The Dublin Division comprises the following counties: Dodge, Johnson, Laurens, Montgomery, Telfair, Treutlen, and Wheeler.

The Savannah Division comprises the following counties: Bryan, Chatham, Effingham, and Liberty.

The Statesboro Division comprises the following counties: Bulloch, Candler, Emanuel,  Evans, Jenkins, Screven, Tattnall, and Toombs.

The Waycross Division comprises the following counties: Atkinson, Bacon, Brantley, Charlton, Coffee, Pierce, and Ware.

Current judges 
:

Former judges

Chief judges

Succession of seats

See also 
 Courts of Georgia
 List of current United States district judges
 List of United States federal courthouses in Georgia

References

External links 
 United States District Court for the Southern District of Georgia
 United States Attorney for the Southern District of Georgia

Georgia, Southern
Georgia (U.S. state) law
Augusta, Georgia
Brunswick, Georgia
Savannah, Georgia
1848 establishments in Georgia (U.S. state)
Courts and tribunals established in 1848